Vilson Ahmeti  (born 5 September 1951 in Fier) is an Albanian political figure. He served as the 27th Prime Minister of Albania between 10 December 1991 and 13 April 1992. He was appointed to the position by President Ramiz Alia on December 4, following the dismissal of seven ministers, the resignation of Ylli Bufi, and the dissolution of the June 12th caretaker government. He had previously served as a minister in the Socialist government.

On 31 August 1993, Ahmeti was sentenced to two years in prison on charges of abuse of power.

References 

1951 births
Living people
People from Fier
Government ministers of Albania
Prime Ministers of Albania